Muzeum Narodowe is the Polish language name of a number of museums in Poland, meaning  National Museum. It may refer to:

 National Museum of Poland
 National Museum, Gdańsk 
 National Museum, Kraków 
 National Museum, Poznań 
 National Museum, Szczecin 
 National Museum, Warsaw 
 National Museum, Wrocław